Aminata Ndong (born 3 May 1980) is a Senegalese former fencer. She competed in the women's individual épée event at the 2004 Summer Olympics.

References

External links
 

1980 births
Living people
Senegalese female épée fencers
Olympic fencers of Senegal
Fencers at the 2004 Summer Olympics
20th-century Senegalese women
21st-century Senegalese women